Michael Henry Heim (January 21, 1943September 29, 2012) was an American literary translator and scholar. He translated literature from eight languages (Russian, Czech, Serbo-Croatian, German, Dutch, French, Romanian, and Hungarian), including works by Anton Chekhov, Milan Kundera, and Günter Grass. He received his doctorate in Slavic languages and literature from Harvard in 1971, and joined the faculty of UCLA the following year. In 2003, he and his wife used their life savings ($734,000) to establish the PEN Translation Fund.

Biography
Heim was born in Manhattan, New York City, on January 21, 1943. His father, Imre Heim, was Hungarian, born in Budapest. He moved to the U.S. in 1939, where he was a music composer (under the pseudonym Imre Hajdu) and a master baker. In New York, Imre was working as a piano teacher when he was introduced to Blanche, Heim's mother, whom he married shortly thereafter. Shortly after Pearl Harbor, Imre joined the U.S. Army. At the time of Heim's birth, Imre was stationed in Alabama.

Heim's father died when he was four, and he was raised by his mother and step-father in Staten Island. In 1966, he was drafted into the US Army during the Vietnam War. When it was discovered that he was the sole surviving son of a soldier who had died in service, he was relieved from the draft.

During the Soviet invasion of Czechoslovakia in 1968, Heim was in Prague employed as translator by UNESCO. When the tanks rolled into Prague, he was in the unique position of being able to translate between Czech and Russian, thereby facilitating communications between the Soviet soldiers and the Czechoslovaks on the streets. With his knowledge of German, he was also able to assist a West German television crew in navigating the occupied city and interviewing ordinary Czech citizens, and to warn potential victims that Soviet agents were looking for them.

He was married for thirty-seven years to his wife, Priscilla Smith Kerr, who brought three children of her own, Rebecca, Jocelyn and Michael, into the family from a previous marriage. He died on September 29, 2012, of complications from melanoma.

Education
Heim graduated from Curtis High School on Staten Island, where he studied French and German. He double-majored in Oriental Civilization and Russian Language and Literature, studying Chinese and Russian at Columbia University as an undergraduate, and worked with Gregory Rabassa, an acclaimed translator. As an American citizen, he had no chance of visiting China after his graduation, so he decided to concentrate on Russian at the postgraduate level. He received his Ph.D. in Slavic Languages from Harvard University in 1971, under the mentorship of Roman Jakobson.

Career
Heim was one of the finest and most prolific translators of his age. He was also a faculty member of the UCLA Department of Slavic Languages and Literatures for nearly 40 years, being promoted prior to his death to UCLA Distinguished Professor.

Every two years, Heim taught a workshop in literary translation at UCLA's Department of Comparative Literature, which was highly regarded by his students.

Heim served as editor of a translation series published by Northwestern University Press, and was several times a juror for the National Endowment for the Humanities.

After Heim's death, it was revealed with his wife's permission that he was the secret donor behind the PEN Translation Fund, which was set up in 2003 with his gift of $730,000.

Awards and recognition

Heim garnered unusually wide recognition for his translations, and was considered one of the foremost literary translators of the late twentieth century. He won the 2005 Helen and Kurt Wolff Translator's Prize for German-to-English translation of Thomas Mann’s Death in Venice (Der Tod in Venedig). He received the PEN/Ralph Manheim Medal for Translation in 2009. In 2010, he received the PEN Translation Prize for his translation from the Dutch of Wonder (De verwondering, 1962) by Hugo Claus. The same book was also short-listed for Three Percent's Best Translated Book Award.

Besides his celebrated translations, Heim was lauded for his research on 18th-century Russian writers and their philosophies of translation, at a time "when the process of literary creation occurred largely through the prism of translation."

Heim was inducted into the American Academy of Arts and Sciences in 2002, and received a Guggenheim Fellowship in 2006.

Publications

Original works

Translations

From Russian

 (Republished by Northwestern University Press in 1997 as Anton Chekhov's Life and Thought: Selected Letters and Commentaries. .)

From Czech

From Serbian

From Croatian

From German

From Dutch

From French

From Romanian

From Hungarian

References

1943 births
2012 deaths
20th-century translators
21st-century American translators
American people of Hungarian descent
Curtis High School alumni
Deaths from cancer in California
Deaths from melanoma
Dutch–English translators
French–English translators
German–English translators
Harvard University alumni
Hungarian–English translators
People from Manhattan
Russian–English translators
Serbian–English translators
Translators from Croatian
Translators from Czech
Translators of Thomas Mann
University of California, Los Angeles faculty